This is a list of notable footballers who have played for A.S. Roma. This means players that have played 100 or more official matches for the club.

For a list of all Roma players, major or minor, with a Wikipedia article, see :Category:A.S. Roma players; for a selected list of the best players in Roma's history, see A.S. Roma Hall of Fame. For a list of players with less than 100 matches played, see List of A.S. Roma players (25–99 appearances).

Players are listed as of 10 January 2021 and according to the date of their first-team debut for the club. Appearances and goals are for first-team competitive matches only; wartime matches are excluded. Substitute appearances included.

Players

Nationality column refers to the country (countries) represented internationally by the player, if any.

Captains

Key
 GK – Goalkeeper
 SW – Sweeper
 RB – Right back
 LB – Left back
 DF – Defender
 MF – Midfielder
 RW – Right winger
 LW – Left winger
 FW – Forward

References

 
 
 

Roma
Players
Association football player non-biographical articles